This was the first and last edition of the men's tennis tournament.

Blaž Kavčič won the title, defeating Alexander Kudryavtsev in the final, 6–2, 3–6, 7–5.

Seeds

Draw

Finals

Top half

Bottom half

References
Main Draw
Qualifying Draw

Tianjin Health Industry Park - Singles
Tianjin Health Industry Park